Ramsey was a parliamentary constituency in Huntingdonshire, which elected one Member of Parliament (MP) to the House of Commons of the Parliament of the United Kingdom. It was also known as North Huntingdonshire.

History
The constituency was created as the Northern or Ramsey Division upon the abolition of the two member Huntingdonshire constituency under the Redistribution of Seats Act 1885. It was one of two county divisions of Huntingdonshire (the other being the Southern or Huntingdon Division). It was abolished under the Representation of the People Act 1918 when it was re-combined with Huntingdon and Huntingdonshire was re-established as a single member constituency.

The division was a predominantly rural area. In addition it included some suburbs of Peterborough and the small towns of Ramsey and St. Ives, as well as part of the Fens.

The Liberal strength in the constituency came from the freeholders of Peterborough (who could vote in Ramsey), the working class Peterborough suburban vote and the smallholders of the Fens. However the area was mostly Conservative, with the rural population under the influence of the largest local landowner Lord de Ramsey. Except for the 1906 general election the Conservative Party won every election in the constituency.

In the 1885 general election one of the former Conservative MPs for the undivided county of Huntingdonshire, William Fellowes was elected the first member from the division. In July 1887 his father, Edward Fellowes, was created the 1st Lord de Ramsey - shortly before his death on 9 August 1887. William Fellowes was thereby elevated to the peerage and vacated his seat in the House of Commons.

The Fellowes family continued to dominate the representation of the division. A younger son of the 1st Baron, the Honourable Ailwyn Fellowes was elected to replace his brother. Fellowes retained the seat until he was defeated in the Liberal landslide in the 1906 general election.

The Liberal MP elected in 1906, Alexander Boulton, was a Canadian lawyer (who later in his career helped found the English-Speaking Union). He was not able to secure re-election in either of the 1910 elections. He was defeated by the fourth and last MP for the constituency, the Conservative Oliver Locker-Lampson.

During the First World War Locker-Lampson served with the R.N.A.S. Armoured Car Unit and also represented the Ministry of Information in various countries. He was involved in France, Belgium, Russia, Romania, Turkey and Persia between 1914 and 1919. He received the Orders of Leopold of Belgium and St Vladimir of Russia amongst other decorations.

Boundaries 
The Sessional Divisions of Hurstingstone, Norman Cross, and Ramsey.

Members of Parliament

Election results

Elections in the 1880s

Fellowes was elevated to the peerage, becoming Lord De Ramsey, causing a by-election.

Elections in the 1890s

Elections in the 1900s

Elections in the 1910s

See also
Parliamentary representation from Huntingdonshire
List of former United Kingdom Parliament constituencies

References

Sources 
 Boundaries of Parliamentary Constituencies 1885-1972, compiled and edited by F.W.S. Craig (Parliamentary Reference Publications 1972)
 Social Geography of British Elections 1885-1910. by Henry Pelling (Macmillan 1967)
 Who's Who of British Members of Parliament: Volume I 1832-1885, edited by M. Stenton (The Harvester Press 1976)
 Who's Who of British Members of Parliament, Volume II 1886-1918, edited by M. Stenton and S. Lees (Harvester Press 1978)
 Who's Who of British Members of Parliament, Volume III 1919-1945, edited by M. Stenton and S. Lees (Harvester Press 1979)

Politics of Huntingdonshire
Parliamentary constituencies in the East of England (historic)
Constituencies of the Parliament of the United Kingdom established in 1885
Constituencies of the Parliament of the United Kingdom disestablished in 1918